In algebra, a Taft Hopf algebra is a Hopf algebra  introduced by  that is neither commutative nor cocommutative and has an antipode of large even order.

Construction

Suppose that k is a field with a primitive n'''th root of unity ζ for some positive integer n. The Taft algebra is the n2-dimensional associative algebra generated over k by c and x with the relations cn=1, xn=0, xc=ζcx. The coproduct takes c to c⊗c and x to c⊗x + x⊗1.
The counit takes c to 1 and x to 0. The antipode takes c to c−1 and x to –c−1x: the order of the antipode is 2n (if n'' > 1).

References

Hopf algebras